"Mio My Mio" (Swedish: "Mio min Mio") is a song performed by Swedish group Gemini for the 1987 film Mio in the Land of Faraway. The song was composed by Benny Andersson and Björn Ulvaeus. The lyrics exist in both English, Swedish and Russian versions.

In 1987, Gemini released the song as a single and as part of their album Geminism. It became a hit in Sweden, with the single staying in the top ten for 5 weeks and peaking at number 3.

In 1987 and 1988, CBS Records  released the soundtrack of Mio in the Land of Faraway on LP and CD. "Mio My Mio" was included as a track in these releases.

Chart performance 
The single stayed in the Swedish Top List for six weeks, stayed in the top ten for five weeks and peaked at number 3.

References

External links 
 "Mio min Mio" at the Swedish Top List

1987 songs
Gemini (Swedish band) songs
Songs written by Benny Andersson and Björn Ulvaeus
Adaptations of works by Astrid Lindgren